Arise Gheorghe, Arise Ioan! is a poem by Radu Gyr. In 1958 Radu Gyr was imprisoned and sentenced to death (commuted to life sentences and pardoned a few years later) by the communist authorities of the Romanian People's Republic because of his subversive poem. The poem had asked for peasants to oppose in every way the regime's agricultural policies: it had been issued as the last wave of brutal collectivization was taking hold of the rural landscape. According to Orthodox priest Fabian Seiche, while in prison, Gyr was not treated for any illnesses he had, was often starved, and even tortured.

It is still a very controversial issue in Romania. Literary critic  finds that the poem is "full of drama, of great expressive power" in which "communism itself is transfigured and appears as a metaphysical evil". He contends that the poem has nothing to do with Gyr's past membership in the Iron Guard fascist movement, but can be viewed separately; he proposes a thought experiment: "If we did not know that Radu Gyr he was a legionnaire in his youth, we would not see anything legionary in this poem. It is about a cry of revolt against communism, in the tragic years when our peasants were forcibly dispossessed of their land by the Soviet occupiers, in complicity with the Romanian communists". On the other hand, the critic Nicolae Manolescu considers that the poem is "literary mediocre", yet he also emphasizes "the confusion between Gyr's legionarism and the anti-communism of the poem".

References

External links 
 
 

Romanian songs
Romanian poems
1958 poems
Communism in Romania